Duck Island is the one of two islands in the Charles E. Wheeler Wildlife Management Area at the mouth of the Housatonic River. The island is uninhabited and is designated as a Department of Environmental Protection Natural Area Preserve, though people may visit the island outside of bird nesting season. The maximum elevation on the island is ~.

The island is within the boundaries of the City of Milford, Connecticut and is owned and managed by State of Connecticut.

Transportation
All transportation to and from the island is by boat.

References

Milford, Connecticut
River islands of Connecticut
Landforms of New Haven County, Connecticut
Uninhabited islands of the United States